The 2002 Florida Atlantic University Owls football team represented Florida Atlantic University in the 2002 NCAA Division I-AA football season. The team was coached by Howard Schnellenberger and played their home games at Pro Player Stadium in Miami Gardens, Florida.  The Owls competed in the NCAA Division I-AA as an independent.

Schedule

References

Florida Atlantic
Florida Atlantic Owls football seasons
Florida Atlantic Owls football